Cuisines and food of the Indian state of Haryana is known to be simple. People of the state prefer their food to be made with fresh ingredients and through simple recipes. Roti (a form of chapati) is a staple food in Haryana which is made from a variety of grains and flours (Wheat, gram flour, barley etc.). Since Haryana is rich with agriculture and cattle, the use of dairy products is abundant in their food. Many households churn out fresh butter from milk and use it as opposed to the butter available in the markets. Lassi (also popular in Punjab) is a popular and staple drink in Haryana. The food in Haryana finds a lot of similarities with its neighboring states Punjab and Rajasthan.

Popular Cuisines of Haryana 

 Kachri Ki Sabzi
 Singri Ki Sabzi
 Hara Dhania Cholia
 Methi Gajjar
 Kadhi Pakora
 Mixed Dal
 Khichri
 Bathua Raita
 Tamatar Chutney
 Besan Masala Roti-Makhan
 Bajra Aloo Roti-Makhan
 Bhura Roti w/Ghee
 Mithe Chawal
 Lassi
 Churma
 Malpuas

References 

Indian cuisine by state or union territory